Double Down News (DDN) is a British alternative media outlet founded in 2016 by Yannis Mendez. Funded through Patreon and originally known as Core Politics, it produces interviews, films and short films from a left-wing perspective.

DDN contributors have included former Daily Telegraph journalist Peter Oborne, Guardian columnist George Monbiot, Darryl McDaniels, Chris Packham, Ken Loach, Guz Khan, Nabil Abdul Rashid, Owen Jones, David Graeber, John McDonnell, Peter Jukes, and Matt Kennard.

In August 2017, DDN published a video related to "Traingate", when Jeremy Corbyn had been accused of lying about a Virgin train being full and him being forced to sit on the floor. Jasper Jackson of the New Statesman reviewed that though its video "tells a convincing and detailed account of the whole affair", and reflects poorly on mainstream media reporting, the video was misleading. It presented widely broadcast footage as "never-before seen" and does not disclose that the videomaker capturing footage for Corbyn was a director of DDN.

In October 2018, due to a "violation of community standards", Facebook removed a DDN video featuring Monbiot talking about the alleged atrocities of Christopher Columbus. It was restored the following day, accompanied by an apology.

In October 2022, it published a video by Oborne talking about the Conservative Party having been taken over by the super rich who pushed for tax cutting policies which was in the mini budget and then a U-turn was made by Liz Truss's government.

References

External links
 

British political websites
Left-wing politics in the United Kingdom
Internet properties established in 2016